Potamoidea is a superfamily of freshwater crabs, comprising the two families Potamidae and Potamonautidae. Two previously recognised families, Deckeniidae and Platythelphusidae, are now treated as parts of the family Potamonautidae.

References

 
Crabs
Arthropod superfamilies